Migliore is a surname of Italian origin. The name refers to:
Aniello Migliore (b. 1933), American mobster; leader of the New York Lucchese crime family
Celestino Migliore (b. 1952), Italian Roman Catholic archbishop
Cristiano Migliore (b. 1971), Italian metal musician
Daniel L. Migliore, Christian theologian and author
Pablo Migliore (b. 1982), Argentine professional football player
Richard Migliore (b. 1964), American Thoroughbred racing jockey
Jane Migliore (b. 1961), American artist

See also
 Migliori

Italian-language surnames